Madison Brengle was the defending champion, but she chose to compete in Wuhan instead. 

Michaëlla Krajicek won the title, defeating Shelby Rogers in the final, 6–3, 6–1.

Seeds

Main draw

Finals

Top half

Bottom half

References 
 Main draw

Red Rock Pro Open - Singles
2015 Red Rock Pro Open